Albuca is a genus of flowering plants in the family Asparagaceae, subfamily Scilloideae. The genus is distributed mainly in southern and eastern Africa, with some species occurring in northern Africa and the Arabian Peninsula. Plants of the genus are known commonly as slime lilies.

Description
These are perennial herbs growing from bulbs. The stem is sheathed in leaves with linear to strap-shaped blades. They can be 8 centimeters to well over one meter long and are flat or keeled. They are generally fleshy and sappy with a mucilaginous juice that inspired the common name "slime lilies". The flowers of some species are scented, especially at night. They are borne in racemes, usually slender, but flat-topped in some species. The flowers may be on stiff, or slender, nodding stalks, held erect or drooping. The six tepals are white to yellow and each has a green or brown stripe down the center. The outer three tepals spread open, while the inner three are connivent, curving inward so that the tips meet. There are six stamens, which have wings at the bases that wrap around the ovary at the center of the flower. Some species have six fertile stamens, and in others the outer stamens are staminodes which do not produce pollen. The fruit is a rounded or oval three-lobed capsule containing shiny black seeds.

The three inner tepals can be closed firmly, raising the question of how pollinators might reach the stigma inside to deposit pollen. In a study of the interaction between pollinators and Albuca flowers, leafcutter bees were observed prying open the tepals and squeezing through to obtain the nectar inside. In the process, they left pollen on the tips of the tepals, where it absorbed fluid, germinated, and fertilized ovules. This was the first known case of flower petals performing the function of the stigma.

Systematics
The genus is circumscribed in two ways. The traditional genus Albuca is a monophyletic group of about 60 known species, and possibly about 100 in total. Other authorities have considered Albuca in a wider sense, including such genera as Stellarioides, Coilonox, Trimelopter, and Battandiera, for a total of 110 to 180 very heterogeneous species. All of these genera, including Albuca, have also been lumped together in Ornithogalum at times, but molecular phylogenetics studies support their separation.

Species

The genus, defined broadly, contains about 160 accepted species, according to the World Checklist of Selected Plant Families .

 Albuca abyssinica Jacq. – Tropical & S. Africa, S.W. Arabian Peninsula
 Albuca acuminata Baker – Namibia to W. Cape Province
 Albuca adlami Baker – Northern Province ?
 Albuca albucoides (Aiton) J.C.Manning & Goldblatt – S.W. Cape Province
 Albuca amboensis (Schinz) Oberm. – Namibia to Botswana
 Albuca amoena (Batt.) J.C.Manning & Goldblatt – N.W. Sahara
 Albuca anisocrispa Mart.-Azorín & M.B.Crespo – E. Cape Province
 Albuca annulata Mart.-Azorín & M.B.Crespo – Eastern Cape Province
 Albuca arenosa J.C.Manning & Goldblatt – W. Cape Province
 Albuca aurea Jacq. – S.W. Cape Province
 Albuca autumnula (U.Müll.-Doblies & D.Müll.-Doblies) J.C.Manning & Goldblatt – S.W. Cape Province
 Albuca bakeri Mart.-Azorín & M.B.Crespo – S. Cape Province
 Albuca barbata (Jacq.) J.C.Manning & Goldblatt – Cape Province
 Albuca batteniana Hilliard & B.L.Burtt – S. Cape Province – wild coast albuca 
 Albuca bifolia Baker – S. Cape Province
 Albuca bifoliata R.A.Dyer – S. Cape Province
 Albuca boucheri U.Müll.-Doblies – S.W. Cape Province
 Albuca bracteata (Thunb.) J.C.Manning & Goldblatt – E. Cape Province to KwaZulu-Natal
 Albuca bruce-bayeri U.Müll.-Doblies – Cape Province
 Albuca buchananii Baker – S. Tropical Africa
 Albuca canadensis (L.) F.M.Leight. – Cape Province
 Albuca candida (Oberm.) J.C.Manning & Goldblatt – Namibia
 Albuca caudata Jacq. – S.E. Cape Province
 Albuca chartacea (Mart.-Azorín, M.B.Crespo & A.P.Dold) J.C.Manning & Goldblatt – Eastern Cape Province
 Albuca chlorantha Welw. ex Baker – Angola
 Albuca ciliaris U.Müll.-Doblies – W. Cape Province
 Albuca clanwilliamae-gloria U.Müll.-Doblies – W. Cape Province
 Albuca collina Baker – S. Cape Province
 Albuca comosa (Welw. ex Baker) J.C.Manning & Goldblatt – Angola
 Albuca concordiana Baker – Namibia to Cape Province
 Albuca consanguinea (Kunth) J.C.Manning & Goldblatt – S.W. Cape Province
 Albuca cooperi Baker – S.W. Cape Province
 Albuca corymbosa Baker – S. Cape Province
 Albuca costatula (U.Müll.-Doblies & D.Müll.-Doblies) J.C.Manning & Goldblatt – Namibia
 Albuca craibii (Mart.-Azorín, M.B.Crespo & A.P.Dold) J.C.Manning & Goldblatt – North-West Province
 Albuca cremnophila van Jaarsv. & A.E.van Wyk – S. Cape Province
 Albuca crinifolia Baker – KwaZulu-Natal
 Albuca crispa J.C.Manning & Goldblatt – S. Cape Province to Free state
 Albuca crudenii Archibald – S. Cape Province
 Albuca dalyae Baker – S. Cape Province
 Albuca darlingana U.Müll.-Doblies – S.W. Cape Province
 Albuca deaconii van Jaarsv. – KwaZulu-Natal
 Albuca decipiens U.Müll.-Doblies – W. Cape Province
 Albuca deserticola J.C.Manning & Goldblatt – Namibia to N.W. Cape Province
 Albuca dilucula (Oberm.) J.C.Manning & Goldblatt – Cape Province
 Albuca dinteri U.Müll.-Doblies – Namibia
 Albuca donaldsonii Rendle – Ethiopia to Tanzania
 Albuca dyeri (Poelln.) J.C.Manning & Goldblatt – Cape Province
 Albuca echinosperma U.Müll.-Doblies – S.W. Cape Province
 Albuca engleriana K.Krause & Dinter – Namibia
 Albuca etesiogaripensis U.Müll.-Doblies – Namibia to N.W. Cape Province
 Albuca fastigiata Dryand. – S. Cape Province
 Albuca fibrotunicata Gledhill & Oyewole – Niger to Cameroon
 Albuca flaccida Jacq. – S.W. Cape Province
 Albuca foetida U.Müll.-Doblies – S.W. Cape Province
 Albuca fragrans Jacq. – S.W. Cape Province
 Albuca gageoides K.Krause – Namibia
 Albuca galeata Welw. ex Baker – Angola
 Albuca gariepensis J.C.Manning & Goldblatt – N. Cape Province
 Albuca gentilii De Wild. – Zaïre
 Albuca gethylloides (U.Müll.-Doblies & D.Müll.-Doblies) J.C.Manning & Goldblatt – W. Cape Province
 Albuca gildenhuysii (van Jaarsv.) van Jaarsv. - N.W. Cape Province
 Albuca glandulifera J.C.Manning & Goldblatt – Namibia to N.W. Cape Province
 Albuca glandulosa Baker – Cape Province
 Albuca glauca Baker – Northern Province
 Albuca glaucifolia (U.Müll.-Doblies & D.Müll.-Doblies) J.C.Manning & Goldblatt – W. Cape Province
 Albuca goswinii U.Müll.-Doblies – S.W. Cape Province
 Albuca grandis J.C.Manning & Goldblatt – Western Cape Province
 Albuca hallii U.Müll.-Doblies – Namibia to W. Cape Province
 Albuca hereroensis Schinz – Namibia
 Albuca hesquaspoortensis U.Müll.-Doblies – S.W. Cape Province
 Albuca homblei De Wild. – Zaïre
 Albuca humilis Baker – Free State to KwaZulu-Natal
 Albuca juncifolia Baker – S.W. Cape Province
 Albuca karachabpoortensis (U.Müll.-Doblies & D.Müll.-Doblies) J.C.Manning & Goldblatt – W. Cape Province
 Albuca karasbergensis Glover – Namibia
 Albuca karooica U.Müll.-Doblies – Namibia to Cape Province
 Albuca katangensis De Wild. – S. Zaïre
 Albuca kirkii (Baker) Brenan – Kenya to S. Tropical Africa
 Albuca kirstenii (J.C.Manning & Goldblatt) J.C.Manning & Goldblatt – S.W. Cape Province
 Albuca knersvlaktensis (U.Müll.-Doblies & D.Müll.-Doblies) J.C.Manning & Goldblatt – S.W. Cape Province
 Albuca kundelungensis De Wild. – Zaïre
 Albuca lebaensis (van Jaarsv.) J.C.Manning & Goldblatt – Angola
 Albuca leucantha U.Müll.-Doblies – N.W. Cape Province
 Albuca longifolia Baker – S. Cape Province
 Albuca longipes Baker – Cape Province
 Albuca macowanii Baker – S. Cape Province
 Albuca malangensis Baker – Angola
 Albuca massonii Baker – W. Cape Province
 Albuca monarchos (U.Müll.-Doblies & D.Müll.-Doblies) J.C.Manning & Goldblatt – W. Cape Province
 Albuca monophylla Baker – Angola to Namibia
 Albuca myogaloides Welw. ex Baker – Angola
 Albuca namaquensis Baker – Namibia to Cape Province
 Albuca nana Schönland – S. Cape Province
 Albuca nathoana (U.Müll.-Doblies & D.Müll.-Doblies) J.C.Manning & Goldblatt – W. Cape Province
 Albuca navicula U.Müll.-Doblies – W. Cape Province
 Albuca nelsonii N.E.Br. – E. Cape Province to KwaZulu-Natal – Nelson's slime lily
 Albuca nigritana (Baker) Troupin – W. Tropical Africa to Rwanda
 Albuca obtusa J.C.Manning & Goldblatt – W. Cape Province
 Albuca osmynella (U.Müll.-Doblies & D.Müll.-Doblies) J.C.Manning & Goldblatt – W. Cape Province
 Albuca ovata (Thunb.) J.C.Manning & Goldblatt – Cape Province
 Albuca papyracea J.C.Manning & Goldblatt – Cape Province
 Albuca paradoxa Dinter – Namibia to W. Cape Province
 Albuca paucifolia (U.Müll.-Doblies & D.Müll.-Doblies) J.C.Manning & Goldblatt – Cape Province
 Albuca pearsonii (F.M.Leight.) J.C.Manning & Goldblatt – Namibia to N.W. Cape Province
 Albuca pendula B.Mathew – S.W. Saudi Arabia
 Albuca pendulina (U.Müll.-Doblies & D.Müll.-Doblies) J.C.Manning & Goldblatt – Namibia
 Albuca pentheri (Zahlbr.) J.C.Manning & Goldblatt – Cape Province
 Albuca polyodontula (U.Müll.-Doblies & D.Müll.-Doblies) J.C.Manning & Goldblatt – Namibia
 Albuca polyphylla Baker – S. Cape Province
 Albuca prasina (Ker Gawl.) J.C.Manning & Goldblatt – S. Africa
 Albuca prolifera J.H.Wilson – S. Cape Province
 Albuca psammophora (U.Müll.-Doblies & D.Müll.-Doblies) J.C.Manning & Goldblatt – W. Cape Province
 Albuca pseudobifolia Mart.-Azorín & M.B.Crespo – Eastern Cape Province
 Albuca pulchra (Schinz) J.C.Manning & Goldblatt – Angola to Botswana
 Albuca rautanenii (Schinz) J.C.Manning & Goldblatt – Namibia
 Albuca recurva (Oberm.) J.C.Manning & Goldblatt – Namibia
 Albuca riebeekkasteelberganula U.Müll.-Doblies – S.W. Cape Province
 Albuca robertsoniana U.Müll.-Doblies – S.W. Cape Province
 Albuca rogersii Schönland – S. Cape Province
 Albuca roodeae (E.Phillips) J.C.Manning & Goldblatt – Cape Province
 Albuca rupestris Hilliard & B.L.Burtt – KwaZulu-Natal
 Albuca sabulosa (U.Müll.-Doblies & D.Müll.-Doblies) J.C.Manning & Goldblatt – Cape Province
 Albuca scabrocostata (U.Müll.-Doblies & D.Müll.-Doblies) J.C.Manning & Goldblatt – W. Cape Province
 Albuca scabromarginata De Wild. – Zaïre
 Albuca schinzii Baker – Namibia
 Albuca schlechteri Baker – Northern Cape Province
 Albuca schoenlandii Baker – S. Cape Province
 Albuca secunda (Jacq.) J.C.Manning & Goldblatt – Cape Province
 Albuca seineri (Engl. & K.Krause) J.C.Manning & Goldblatt – S. Africa
 Albuca semipedalis Baker – Cape Province
 Albuca setosa Jacq. – Cape Province to KwaZulu-Natal
 Albuca shawii Baker – S. Africa
 Albuca somersetianum – S. Cape Province
 Albuca spiralis L.f. – W. Cape Province
 Albuca stapffii (Schinz) J.C.Manning & Goldblatt – Namibia
 Albuca steudneri Schweinf. & Engl. – E. Sudan
 Albuca strigosula (U.Müll.-Doblies & D.Müll.-Doblies) J.C.Manning & Goldblatt – Namibia
 Albuca stuetzeliana (U.Müll.-Doblies & D.Müll.-Doblies) J.C.Manning & Goldblatt – Namibia to N.W. Cape Province
 Albuca suaveolens (Jacq.) J.C.Manning & Goldblatt – Namibia to Cape Province
 Albuca subglandulosa (U.Müll.-Doblies & D.Müll.-Doblies) J.C.Manning & Goldblatt – W. Cape Province
 Albuca subspicata Baker – Angola
 Albuca sudanica A.Chev. – W. Tropical Africa to Sahara and W. Sudan
 Albuca tenuifolia Baker – S. Cape Province
 Albuca tenuis Knudtzon – Central Ethiopia to Kenya
 Albuca thermarum van Jaarsv. – Cape Province
 Albuca tortuosa Baker – E. Cape Province
 Albuca toxicaria (C.Archer & R.H.Archer) J.C.Manning & Goldblatt – Namibia to Cape Province
 Albuca trachyphylla U.Müll.-Doblies – N.W. Cape Province
 Albuca tubiformis (Oberm.) J.C.Manning & Goldblatt – Namibia
 Albuca unifolia (Retz.) J.C.Manning & Goldblatt – Namibia to Free State
 Albuca unifoliata G.D.Rowley – W. Cape Province
 Albuca variegata De Wild. – Zaïre
 Albuca villosa U.Müll.-Doblies – S.W. Namibia to W. Cape Province
 Albuca virens (Lindl.) J.C.Manning & Goldblatt – Eritrea to S. Africa
 Albuca viscosa L.f. – Namibia to W. Cape Province
 Albuca vittata Ker Gawl. – Cape Province
 Albuca volubilis (H.Perrier) J.C.Manning & Goldblatt – W. Madagascar
 Albuca watermeyeri (L.Bolus) J.C.Manning & Goldblatt – Cape Province
 Albuca weberlingiorum U.Müll.-Doblies – Cape Province
 Albuca xanthocodon Hilliard & B.L.Burtt – Mpumalanga to S.E. Cape Province
 Albuca yerburyi Ridl. – Yemen
 Albuca zebrina Baker – W. Cape Province
 Albuca zenkeri Engl. – Cameroon

Cultivation
The most popular species is Albuca nelsonii, which is evergreen and not frost-hardy. Such species are best suited to temperate areas, but can be grown in a conservatory or greenhouse, or in a sheltered position if light frosts might occur.  However, some other species from alpine or Karoo-like areas are fairly frost-resistant and may be deciduous, and accordingly can stand a good deal of frost once established. Some in fact are winter-flowering. As a rule they do well in full sun in light, free-draining soil. Propagate from offsets or seed.

References

External links
Albuca. Red List of South African Plants. South African National Biodiversity Institute (SANBI).
GRIN Species Records of Albuca. Germplasm Resources Information Network (GRIN). 
Botanica Sistematica
 

 
Asparagaceae genera